Juan Hidalgo is the name of:

 Juan Hidalgo (conquistador) (1514 – ?), Spanish conquistador;
 Juan Hidalgo de Polanco (1614–1685), Spanish composer and harpist;
 Juan Hidalgo Codorniu (1927–2018), Spanish composer, poet and artist, member of the ZAJ group;
 Juan Hidalgo (athlete) (born 1945), Spanish long-distance runner.